The 1997–98 FIBA Korać Cup was the 27th edition of the third tier European basketball tournament FIBA Korać cup and had 84 participants (42 teams played from the first round and another 42 teams from the second round). Mash Jeans Verona won the tournament.

Team allocation 
The labels in the parentheses show how each team qualified for the place of its starting round:

 1st, 2nd, 3rd, etc.: League position after Playoffs
 WC: Wild card

Notes

Qualifying round 

|}

Regular season 

Sources:

Round of 32

|}

Round of 16

|}

Quarterfinals

|}

Semifinals

|}

Finals

|}

See also 
 1997–98 FIBA EuroLeague
 1997–98 FIBA EuroCup

References

1997–98
1997–98 in European basketball